Charles Noland is an American actor, appearing in many TV shows and films, including Blow and Wayne's World. He was a supporting character on ER for 2 seasons and The West Wing for 7 seasons.

Noland also has a lengthy stage career in both acting and directing, including work at the Oregon Shakespeare Festival, ACT Theatre, the Kern Shakespeare Festival, Fort Worth Shakespeare Festival, and Incline, The Theatre Group.

Nolan studied drama at the University of California, Davis and University of California, Santa Cruz.

Filmography

Film

Television

References

American male television actors
Living people
Year of birth missing (living people)
University of California, Davis alumni
University of California, Santa Cruz alumni